The Shire of Clifton was a local government area in the Darling Downs region of Queensland, Australia, southwest of the regional city of Toowoomba.

History 

The Clifton Division was incorporated on 11 November 1879 under the Divisional Boards Act 1879 with a population of 1382.

With the passage of the Local Authorities Act 1902, the Clifton Division became the Shire of Clifton on 31 March 1903.

On 23 January 1915, part of the Shire of Clifton was amalgamated with the Town of Allora to create the new Shire of Allora. The Shire of Clifton continued with smaller boundaries.

On 15 March 2008, under the Local Government (Reform Implementation) Act 2007 passed by the Parliament of Queensland on 10 August 2007, the Shire of Clifton merged with the City of Toowoomba and the Shires of Cambooya, Crows Nest, Jondaryan, Millmerran, Pittsworth and Shire of Rosalie to form the Toowoomba Region.

Towns and localities 
The Shire of Clifton includes the following settlements:

 Clifton
 Kings Creek
 Nobby1
 Pilton

1 - split with the former Shire of Cambooya

Population

Chairmen and mayors 
The leaders of the Clifton Division and Clifton Shire were:

Clifton Divisional Board
 Charles Clarke (1880—1881)
 James Hanly (1881—1882)
 Thomas Grimes (1882—1883)
 William Deacon (1883—1885)
 George Clarke (1886—1888)
 William Deacon (1889—1890)
 James Hanly (1890—1891)
 John Logan (1891—1892)
 John Keleher (1892—1893)
 Andrew Gordon (1893—1894)
 James Hanly (1894—1895)
 Edward Harvey (1895—1896)
 John Logan (1896—1897)
 Edward Harvey (1897—1898)
 Maas Henry Hinz (1899—1900)
 James Bourke (1900—1901)
 Jeremiah Collins (1901—1902)
 John Keleher (1902—1903)

Clifton Shire Council
 Charles Young Gillam (1903—1904)
 Bernard McGovern (1904—1905)
 John Logan (1905—1906)
 Charles Young Gillam (1906—1907)
 John O'Sullivan (1907—1908)
 Edward Cooper (1908—1909)
 Phillip Henry Imhoff (1909—1910)
 John Logan (1910—1911)
 James Purcell (1911—1913)
 Henry Allen Smith (1913—1914)
 James Bourke (1914—1915)
 John Logan (1915—1916)
 John Gallagher (1916—1917)
 James Meara (1917—1921)
 Walter Robert Ross (1922—1923)
 James Meara (1924—1947)
 Heinrich Heinrichsen (1947—1949)
 Herbert Warfield (1949—1955)
 William Bourke (1955—1967)
 William Finlay (1967—1976)
 Virgil O'Leary (1976—1979)
 William Bishop (1979—1982)
 Emmett Lyons (1982—1991)
 Ian Jones (1991—1994)
 Reg Murphy (1994—1997)
 Patricia Collins (1997—2004)
 Ian Jones (2004—2008)

References

External links
 

Former local government areas of Queensland
Darling Downs
Toowoomba
1879 establishments in Australia
2008 disestablishments in Australia
Populated places disestablished in 2008